Tania Joya (born 1983) is a British-American former jihadi and current counter-extremism activist who fled Syria after traveling there with husband John Georgelas to join the Islamic State, and asserted that she had an extramarital romantic relationship with US Representative Van Taylor, who subsequently acknowledged having a relationship and dropped out of a 2022 Texas runoff election.

Early life 
Joya was born as Joya Choudhury in Harrow, north London, UK in 1983 to a "culturally Muslim" Bengali-Bangladeshi family.

She experienced racism growing up in the UK and became a "jihadi hardcore" soon after the September 11 attacks, associating with a group of fundamentalist Algerians.

Adult life 
In 2003, at an anti-war protest in London she was given a piece of paper with a link to a Muslim-dating website, she went on the website and met John Georgelas, an American who had recently converted to Islam. She moved to the USA after marrying Georgelas in Rochdale on his first trip to London in 2004. The couple shared a passion for jihad and dreamed of training their children to be jihadis.

In 2006, Georgelas was sentenced to three years in prison for hacking a pro-Israeli lobby group.

In 2013, the couple moved to Egypt from where Georgelas tricked Joya into travel to Azaz, Aleppo, Syria and where Georgelas joined the Islamic State. After two weeks, she fled Syria, and sought US permission to return to the US, via Turkey. In the US, she cooperated with authorities and stayed with her parents-in-law in Plano, Texas. She has renounced Islam and attends a Unitarian church. 

In June 2018, Joya divorced Georgelas and remarried. She found her second husband to be "controlling" and did not want to move to Colorado with him, so she divorced him.

In March 2022, Joya was living in Plano, and was training to become a hypnotherapist.

Advocacy 
Joya claims she is committed to "reprogramming" extremists, and speaks at events in the US about countering extremism. She works with Faith Matters, a counter-extremism group in the UK, and the Clarion Project. 

In 2019, she urged the British public to show mercy to Shamima Begum.

Van Taylor infidelity allegations 
On February 27, 2022, two days before the primary election for Texas's 3rd congressional district, right-wing media outlet National File posted an interview with Joya in which she discussed having a nine-month sexual affair in 2020 and 2021 with Van Taylor, Republican US Representative serving the 3rd district, who was married to another woman and was facing several primary challengers. Saying that she met Taylor at a jihadi reprogramming session, Joya shared salacious details about the affair, and said that Taylor gave her  for her credit card bills and personal expenses. Her statements were repeated the next day by Breitbart News and circulated widely on social media. The Texas Tribune could not independently verify any of Joya's claims. In a statement to The Dallas Morning News, Joya said she was "annoyed at having to see her ex-lover's face on billboards" and approached Taylor's Republican opponent Suzanne Harp, hoping that Harp would privately persuade Taylor to drop out of the race, but Taylor did not do so, prompting Joya to make her allegations public.

On March 1, 2022, Taylor won a plurality but not a majority of Republican primary votes, triggering a May 24 runoff election. The next day, in an email to supporters, Taylor announced the suspension of his reelection campaign and admitted to an extramarital affair. On March 4, Taylor withdrew from the runoff, thus ceding it to runner-up Keith Self.

In popular culture 
The 2022 Discovery+ documentary A Radical Life presents the story of Joya and her ex-husband, John Georgelas.

Family 
She is the mother of four children. She was pregnant with her fourth child when she fled Syria.

References

External links 
  by The Atlantic

1983 births
Living people
American activists
American critics of Islam
American former Muslims
American people of Bangladeshi descent
British emigrants to the United States
Converts to Christianity from Islam
English Islamists
English people of Bangladeshi descent
People from Harrow, London
Anti-Islam sentiment in the United States
Counter extremism
Islamic State of Iraq and the Levant and the United States